Taharqa, also spelled Taharka or Taharqo (Egyptian: 𓇿𓉔𓃭𓈎 tꜣ-h-rw-k, Akkadian:  Tar-qu-u2, Manetho's Tarakos, Strabo's Tearco), was a pharaoh of the Twenty-fifth Dynasty of Egypt and qore (king) of the Kingdom of Kush (present day Sudan), from 690 to 664 BC. He was one of the "Kushite Pharaohs" who ruled over Egypt for nearly a century.

Early life 

Taharqa was the son of Piye, the Nubian king of Napata who had first conquered Egypt.  Taharqa was also the cousin and successor of Shebitku.  The successful campaigns of Piye and Shabaka paved the way for a prosperous reign by Taharqa.

Ruling period 
Taharqa's reign can be dated from 690 BC to 664 BC. Evidence for the dates of his reign is derived from the Serapeum stele, catalog number 192. This stela records that an Apis bull born and installed (fourth month of Season of the Emergence, day 9) in year 26 of Taharqa died in Year 20 of Psamtik I (4th month of Shomu, day 20), having lived 21 years. This would give Taharqa a reign of 26 years and a fraction, in 690–664 BC.

Irregular accession to power 
Taharqa explicitly states in Kawa Stela V, line 15, that he succeeded his predecessor (generally assumed to be Shebitku but now established to be Shabaka instead) after the latter's death with this statement: "I received the Crown in Memphis after the Falcon flew to heaven." The reference to Shebitku was an attempt by Taharqa to legitimise his accession to power. However, Taharqa never mentions the identity of the royal falcon and completely omits any mention of Shabaka's intervening reign between Shebitku and Taharqa possibly because he ousted Shabaka from power.

In Kawa IV, line 7-13, Taharqa states:

In Kawa V: line 15, Taharqa states

Therefore, Taharqa says that King Shebitku, who was very fond of him, brought him with him to Egypt and during that trip he had the opportunity to see the deplorable state of the temple of Amun at Kawa, an event he remembered after becoming king. But on Kawa V Taharqa says that sometime after his arrival in Egypt under a different king whom this time he chose not to name, there occurred the death of this monarch (Shabaka here) and then his own accession to the throne occurred. Taharqa's evasiveness on the identity of his predecessor suggests that he assumed power in an irregular fashion and chose to legitimise his kingship by conveniently stating the possible fact or propaganda that Shebitku favoured him "more than all his brothers and all his children."

Moreover, in lines 13 – 14 of Kawa stela V, His Majesty (who can be none other but Shebitku), is mentioned twice, and at first sight the falcon or hawk that flew to heaven, mentioned in the very next line 15, seems to be identical with His Majesty referred to directly before (i.e. Shebitku). However, in the critical line 15 which recorded Taharqa's accession to power, a new stage of the narrative begins, separated from the previous one by a period of many years, and the king or hawk/falcon that flew to heaven is conspicuously left unnamed in order to distinguish him from His Majesty, Shebitku. Moreover, the purpose of Kawa V, was to describe several separate events that occurred at distinct stages of Taharqa's life, instead of telling a continuous story about it. Therefore, the Kawa V text began with the 6th year of Taharqa and referred to the High Nile flood of that year before abruptly jumping back to Taharqa's youth at the end of line 13. In the beginning of line 15, Taharqa's coronation is mentioned (with the identity of the hawk/falcon—now known to be Shabaka—left unnamed but if it was Shebitku, Taharqa's favourite king, Taharqa would clearly have identified him) and there is a description given of the extent of the lands and foreign countries under Egypt's control but then (in the middle of line 16) the narrative switches abruptly back again to Taharqa's youth: "My mother was in Ta-Sety …. Now I was far from her as a twenty year old recruit, as I went with His Majesty to the North Land". However, immediately afterwards (around the middle of line 17) the text jumps forward again to the time of Taharqa's accession: "Then she came sailing downstream to see me after a long period of years. She found me after I had appeared on the throne of Horus...". Hence, the Kawa V narrative switches from one event to another, and has little to no chronological coherence or value.

Reign 

Although Taharqa's reign was filled with conflict with the Assyrians, it was also a prosperous renaissance period in Egypt and Kush.  The empire flourished under Taharqa, due in part to a particularly large Nile river flood, abundant crops, and the "intellectual and material resources set free by an efficient central government."  Taharqa's inscriptions indicate that he gave large amounts of gold to the temple of Amun at Kawa.  The Nile valley empire was as large as it had been since the New Kingdom. Taharqa and the 25th dynasty revived Egyptian culture.  Religion, arts, and architecture were restored to their glorious Old, Middle, and New Kingdom forms.  During Taharqa's reign, the "central features of Theban theology were merged with Egyptian Middle and New Kingdom imperial ideology.".  Under Taharqa, the cultural integration of Egypt and Kush reached such a point that it could not be reversed, even after the Assyrian conquest.

Taharqa restored existing temples and built new ones. Particularly impressive were his additions to the Temple at Karnak, new temple at Kawa, and temples at Jebel Barkal.  Taharqa continued the 25th dynasty's ambitious program to develop Jebel Barkal into a "monumental complex of sancturies...centered around the great temple of...Amun."  The similarity of Jebel Barkal to Karnak "seems to be central to the builders at Jebel Barkal.".  The rest of Taharqa's constructions served to create "Temple Towns", which were "local centers of government, production, and redistribution."

It was during the 25th dynasty that the Nile valley saw the first widespread construction of pyramids (many in modern Sudan) since the Middle Kingdom.  Taharqa built the largest pyramid (~52 meters square at base) in the Nubian region at Nuri (near El-Kurru) with the most elaborate Kushite rock-cut tomb.  Taharqa was buried with "over 1070 shabtis of varying sizes and made of granite, green ankerite, and alabaster."

War between Taharqa and Assyria 

Taharqa began cultivating alliances with elements in Phoenicia and Philistia who were prepared to take a more independent position against Assyria. Taharqa's army undertook successful military campaigns, as attested by the "list of conquered Asiatic principalities" from the Mut temple at Karnak and "conquered peoples and countries (Libyans, Shasu nomads, Phoenicians?, Khor in Palestine)" from Sanam temple inscriptions.  Torok mentions the military success was due to Taharqa's efforts to strengthen the army through daily training in long-distance running, as well as Assyria's preoccupation with Babylon and Elam.  Taharqa also built military settlements at the Semna and Buhen forts and the fortified site of Qasr Ibrim.

Imperial ambitions of the Mesopotamian based Assyrian Empire made war with the 25th dynasty inevitable. In 701 BC, Taharqa and his army aided Judah and King Hezekiah in withstanding a siege by King Sennacherib of the Assyrians (2 Kings 19:9; Isaiah 37:9).  There are various theories (Taharqa's army, disease, divine intervention, Hezekiah's surrender, Herodotus' mice theory) as to why the Assyrians failed to take Jerusalem and withdrew to Assyria.  Many historians claim that Sennacherib was the overlord of Khor following the siege in 701 BC.  Sennacherib's annals record Judah was forced into tribute after the siege.  However, this is contradicted by Khor's frequent utilization of an Egyptian system of weights for trade, the 20 year cessation in Assyria's pattern (before 701 and after Sennacherib's death) of repeatedly invading Khor, Khor paying tribute to Amun of Karnak in the first half of Taharqa's reign, and Taharqa flouting Assyria's ban on Lebanese cedar exports to Egypt, while Taharqa was building his temple to Amun at Kawa.

In 679 BC, Sennacherib's successor, King Esarhaddon, campaigned into Khor and took a town loyal to Egypt.  After destroying Sidon and forcing Tyre into tribute in 677-676 BC, Esarhaddon invaded Egypt proper in 674 BC.  Taharqa and his army defeated the Assyrians outright in 674 BC, according to Babylonian records.  This invasion, which only a few Assyrian sources discuss, ended in what some scholars have assumed was possibly one of Assyria's worst defeats. In 672 BC, Taharqa brought reserve troops from Kush, as mentioned in rock inscriptions.  Taharqa's Egypt still held sway in Khor during this period as evidenced by Esarhaddon's 671 BC annal mentioning that Tyre's King Ba'lu had "put his trust upon his friend Taharqa", Ashkelon's alliance with Egypt, and Esarhaddon's inscription asking "if the Kushite-Egyptian forces 'plan and strive to wage war in any way' and if the Egyptian forces will defeat Esarhaddon at Ashkelon."  However, Taharqa was defeated in Egypt in 671 BC when Esarhaddon conquered Northern Egypt, captured Memphis, imposed tribute, and then withdrew.  Although the Pharaoh Taharqa had escaped to the south, Esarhaddon captured the Pharaoh's family, including "Prince Nes-Anhuret, royal wives," and most of the royal court, which were sent to Assyria as hostages.  Cuneiform tablets mention numerous horses and gold headdresses were taken back to Assyria.  In 669 BC, Taharqa reoccupied Memphis, as well as the Delta, and recommenced intrigues with the king of Tyre.  Taharqa intrigued in the affairs of Lower Egypt, and fanned numerous revolts. Esarhaddon again led his army to Egypt and on his death in 668 BC, the command passed to Ashurbanipal.  Ashurbanipal and the Assyrians again defeated Taharqa and advanced as far south as Thebes, but direct Assyrian control was not established."  The rebellion was stopped and Ashurbanipal appointed as his vassal ruler in Egypt Necho I, who had been king of the city Sais.  Necho's son, Psamtik I was educated at the Assyrian capital of Nineveh during Esarhaddon's reign. As late as 665 BC, the vassal rulers of Sais, Mendes, and Pelusium were still making overtures to Taharqa in Kush.  The vassal's plot was uncovered by Ashurbanipal and all rebels but Necho of Sais were executed.

The remains of three colossal statues of Taharqa were found at the entrance of the palace at Nineveh. These statues were probably brought back as war trophies by Esarhaddon, who also brought back royal hostages and numerous luxury objects from Egypt.

Death 
Taharqa died in the city of Thebes in 664 BC. He was followed by his appointed successor Tantamani, a son of Shabaka, who invaded Lower Egypt in hopes of restoring his family's control. This led to a renewed conflict with Ashurbanipal and the Sack of Thebes by the Assyrians in 663 BCE. He was himself succeeded by a son of Taharqa, Atlanersa.

Nuri pyramid 

Taharqa chose the site of Nuri in North Sudan to build his pyramid, away from the traditional burial site of El-Kurru. It was the first and the largest pyramid of Nuri, and he was followed by close to twenty later kings at the site.

Biblical references 
Mainstream scholars agree that Taharqa is the Biblical "Tirhakah" (Heb: תִּרְהָקָה), king of Ethiopia (Kush), who waged war against Sennacherib during the reign of King Hezekiah of Judah (2 Kings 19:9; Isaiah 37:9).

The events in the biblical account are believed to have taken place in 701 BC, whereas Taharqa came to the throne some ten years later. If the title of king in the biblical text refers to his future royal title, he still may have been too young to be a military commander, although this is disputed.

Aubin mentions that the biblical account in Genesis 10:6-7 (Table of Nations) lists Taharqa's predecessors, Shebitku and
Shabako (סַבְתְּכָ֑א and סַבְתָּ֥ה).  Concerning Taharqa's successor, the sack of Thebes was a momentous event that reverberated throughout the Ancient Near East. It is mentioned in the Book of Nahum chapter 3:8-10:

Depictions 
Taharqa, under the name "Tearco the Aethiopian", was described by the Ancient Greek historian Strabo.  Strabo mentioned Taharqa in a list of other notable conquerors (Cyrus the Great, Xerxes, Sesotris) and mentioned that these princes had undertaken "expeditions to lands far remote." Strabo mentions Taharqa as having "Advanced as far as Europe", and (citing Megasthenes), even as far as the Pillars of Hercules in Spain:  Similarly, in 1534 the Muslim scholar Ibn-l-Khattib al-Makkary wrote an account of Taharqa's "establishment of a garrison in the south of Spain in approximately 702 BC."

The two snakes in the crown of pharaoh Taharqa show that he was the king of both the lands of Egypt and Nubia.

Monuments of Taharqa 

Taharqa has left monuments throughout Egypt and Nubia. In Memphis, Thebes, and Napata he rebuilt or restored the Temple of Amon.

Taharqa in Karnak 
Taharqa is known for various monuments in Karnak.

Shrine of Taharqa in Kawa 

A small temple of Taharqa was once located at Kawa in Nubia (modern Sudan).  It is located today in the Ashmolean Museum.

Taharqa in Jebel Barkal 
Taharqa is depicted in various reliefs in Jebel Barkal, particularly in the Temple of Mut.

Museum artifacts

See also 

List of monarchs of Kush
List of biblical figures identified in extra-biblical sources
Takhar (the deity)
Victory stele of Esarhaddon
Statues of Amun in the form of a ram protecting King Taharqa
Sphinx of Taharqo

References

Sources

Further reading 

 
 
 

 
Nubian people
7th-century BC Pharaohs
7th-century BC monarchs of Kush
Pharaohs of the Twenty-fifth Dynasty of Egypt
Egyptian people of Nubian descent
664 BC deaths
Kingdom of Kush
Year of birth unknown
Pharaohs in the Bible